"USA Today" is a song written and recorded by American country music artist Alan Jackson.  It was released in August 2005 as the fourth single from his album What I Do. It peaked at number 18 on the United States Billboard Hot Country Songs chart, and number 7 on the Bubbling Under Hot 100 chart.

Content
The newspaper, USA Today thinks about doing a story of the loneliest man in the "USA Today".

Chart performance
"USA Today" debuted at number 49 on the U.S. Billboard Hot Country Songs for the week of August 27, 2005.

References

2005 singles
2004 songs
Alan Jackson songs
Songs written by Alan Jackson
Song recordings produced by Keith Stegall
Arista Nashville singles